Post-Britpop is an alternative rock subgenre and is the period in the late 1990s and early 2000s, following Britpop, when the media were identifying a "new generation" or "second wave" of guitar bands influenced by acts like Oasis and Blur, but with less overt British concerns in their lyrics and making more use of American rock and indie influences, as well as experimental music. Bands in the post-Britpop era that had been established acts, but gained greater prominence after the decline of Britpop, such as Radiohead and the Verve, and new acts such as Travis, Keane, Snow Patrol, Stereophonics, Feeder, Toploader and particularly Coldplay, achieved much wider international success than most of the Britpop groups that had preceded them, and were some of the most commercially successful acts of the late 1990s and early 2000s.

Characteristics

Many bands in the post-Britpop era avoided the Britpop label while still producing music derived from it. The music of most bands was guitar based, often mixing elements of British traditional rock, particularly the Beatles, the Rolling Stones and the Small Faces, with American influences. Bands from the era utilized specific elements from 1970s British rock and pop music. Drawn from across the United Kingdom, the themes of their music tended to be less parochially centred on British, English and London life, and more introspective than had been the case with Britpop at its height. This, beside a greater willingness to woo the American press and fans, may have helped a number of them in achieving international success. They have been seen as presenting the image of the rock star as an ordinary person, or "boy-next-door" and their increasingly melodic music was criticised for being bland or derivative.

History

Origins
From about 1997, as dissatisfaction grew with the concept of Cool Britannia and Britpop as a movement began to dissolve, emerging bands began to avoid the Britpop label while still producing music derived from it. Bands that had enjoyed some success during the mid-1990s, but did not find major commercial success until the late 1990s included the Verve and Radiohead. After the decline of Britpop they began to gain more critical and popular attention. The Verve's album Urban Hymns (1997) was a worldwide hit and their commercial peak before they broke up in 1999, while Radiohead although having achieved moderate recognition with The Bends in 1995 achieved near-universal critical acclaim with their experimental third album OK Computer (1997), and its follow-ups Kid A (2000) and Amnesiac (2001).

Developing scenes

The cultural and musical scene in Scotland, dubbed "Cool Caledonia" by some elements of the press, produced a number of successful alternative acts, including the Supernaturals from Glasgow, whose re-released single "Smile" (1997) reached number 25 in the UK charts, and whose album It Doesn't Matter Anymore (1997) entered the top ten, but who failed to sustain their success or achieve the anticipated international breakthrough. Travis, also from Glasgow, were one of the first major rock bands to emerge in the post-Britpop era. Utilising the hooks and guitar rock favoured by Oasis in a song-based format, they moved from the personal on Good Feeling (1997), through the general on their breakthrough The Man Who (1999), to the socially conscious and political on 12 Memories (2003) and have been credited with a major role in disseminating a new Britpop. From Edinburgh Idlewild, more influenced by post-grunge, just failed to break into the British top 50 with their second album Hope Is Important (1998), but subsequently produced 3 top 20 albums, peaking with The Remote Part (2002), and the single "You Held the World in Your Arms", reaching numbers 3 and 9 in the respective UK charts. Although garnering some international attention, they did not break through in the US.

The first major band to breakthrough from the post-Britpop Welsh rock scene, dubbed "Cool Cymru", were Catatonia, whose single "Mulder and Scully" (1998) reached the top ten in the UK, and whose album International Velvet (1998) reached number one, but they were unable to make much impact in the US and, after personal problems, broke up at the end of the century. Stereophonics, also from Wales, used elements of a post-grunge and hardcore on their breakthrough albums Word Gets Around (1997) and Performance and Cocktails (1999), before moving into more melodic territory with Just Enough Education to Perform (2001) and subsequent albums. Also from Wales were Feeder, who were initially more influenced by American post-grunge, producing a hard rock sound that led to their breakthrough single "Buck Rogers" and the album Echo Park (2001). After the death of their drummer Jon Lee, they moved to a more reflective and introspective mode on Comfort in Sound (2002), their most commercially successful album to that point, which spawned a series of hit singles.

There was also a number of British bands getting more 'progressive' in their music style. Radiohead released OK Computer in May 1997, a few months before Oasis released Be Here Now (known as 'the album that killed Britpop' in some parts of the press), with Radiohead's album being followed by Mansun's Six album the next year (released on Parlophone at the time, but now available on progressive rock label Kscope). At the end of the 1990s, Devon band Muse would emerge from Teignmouth and sign to (Australian record company) Mushroom Records' new British arm via independent company Taste Media. Initially dismissed in certain sections of the press as 'Radiohead wannabes', the band would go on to top the UK albums chart six times, with every studio album reaching the top from 2003 to 2018.

Commercial peak

These acts were followed by a number of bands who shared aspects of their music, including Snow Patrol from Northern Ireland, and Athlete, Elbow, Embrace, Starsailor, Doves, Gomez and Keane from England. The most commercially successful band in the millennium were Coldplay, whose first two albums Parachutes (2000) and A Rush of Blood to the Head (2002) went multi-platinum, establishing them as one of the most popular acts in the world by the time of their third album X&Y (2005). Snow Patrol's "Chasing Cars" (from their 2006 album Eyes Open) is the most widely played song of the 21st century on UK radio.

Fragmentation
Bands like Coldplay, Starsailor and Elbow, with introspective lyrics and even tempos, began to be criticised at the beginning of the new millennium as bland and sterile, and the wave of garage rock or post punk revival bands, like The Hives, The Vines, The Strokes, and The White Stripes, that sprang up in that period were welcomed by the musical press as "the saviours of rock and roll". However, a number of the bands of this era, particularly Travis, Stereophonics and Coldplay, continued to record and enjoy commercial success into the new millennium. The notion of a "second wave" of Britpop has also been applied to bands originating in the new millennium, including Razorlight, Kaiser Chiefs, Arctic Monkeys and Bloc Party, These bands have been seen as looking less to music of the 1960s and more to 1970s punk and post-punk, while still being influenced by Britpop.

Significance
Bands in the post-Britpop era have been credited with revitalising the British rock music scene in the late 1990s and 2000s, and of reaping the commercial benefits opened up by Britpop. They have also been criticised for providing a "homogenised and conformist" version of Britpop that serves as music for TV soundtracks, shopping malls, bars and nightclubs.

References

Britpop
1990s in British music
2000s in British music
Alternative rock genres
British styles of music
2010s in British music
British rock music genres